The Xi'an KJ-600 is a Chinese twin-propeller, quad-tail, high-wing military aircraft designed for cargo and airborne early warning and control (AEW&C), intended to be deployed on Type 003 aircraft carriers of the People's Liberation Army Navy from around 2024.

Design and development
The KJ-600 is a high-straight wing aircraft reportedly powered by a pair of WJ-6 turboprop engine, and sports a quad-fin tailplane, tricycle gear and a large dorsal radome suspected to be fitted with an AESA-type system. A non-flying model was observed on a concrete mockup carrier at Wuhan electronic testing facility, The mockup has a striking external resemblance to the aftward-folding Northrop Grumman E-2 Hawkeye. The design is likely to be a case of form following function, as the cancelled Soviet Yakovlev Yak-44 shared the same layout.

The aircraft made its maiden flight on 29 August 2020. Flight testing continued in 2021. A prototype in flight was spotted by aircraft observers above the testing facility in October 2021.

Strategic implication
The Diplomat Rick Joe, who writes extensively on Chinese aviation and naval developments, commented that "fixed wing carrierborne AEW&C are a vital and essential part to any navy that seeks to field a robust and capable carrier airwing, and their ability to enhance a carrier group's offensive and defensive capabilities and overall situational awareness and network-centric warfare is unmatched by any other platform type that will exist in the near future". Analyst H. I. Sutton believed the KJ-600 will be a massive boost to the PLA Navy, and "[o]nce it enters service on the carriers, it will greatly enhance the aerial and maritime situational awareness [...] [a]nd the offensive and defensive capabilities of the carrier group", and that "Chinese aerospace and military industry has certainly shown its ability to develop quite modern and capable AEW&C systems for other air, naval and ground applications".

Specifications (KJ-600)

See also

References

AEW aircraft
Aircraft first flown in 2020
Carrier-based aircraft
High-wing aircraft
Proposed aircraft of China
Twin-turboprop tractor aircraft
KJ-600